Holly Jean Dorger  (born 1989) is an American ballet dancer. She is a principal dancer at the Royal Danish Ballet.

Early life
Dorger's first dance training was Scottish highland dance. She was the U.S. Champion at age 10. Soon, she shifted her focus on ballet. In 2004, at age 14, Dorger started training at the School of American Ballet on full scholarship. She was trained by former New York City Ballet principal dancer Nikolaj Hubbe.

Career
In 2008, at age 18, Dorger joined the Royal Danish Ballet in Copenhagen as a member of the corps de ballet, at the invitation of Hubbe, now the artistic director of the company. Dorger, who was trained with the Balanchine technique, had to adjust to the company's Bournonville method when she first joined, though she did have opportunities to dance Balanchine's works.  While she was in the corp, she danced soloist roles such as Princess Florine in The Sleeping Beauty, Gamzatti in La Bayadere and Dew Drop in The Nutcracker.

In 2013, Dorger was named soloist. In 2016, she was promoted to the rank of principal dancer after dancing Balanchine's Theme and Variations. She has danced principal roles such as Odette/Odile in Swan Lake, the title role in Giselle and Teresina in Napoli, Balanchine repertoire such as Ballo della Regina and contemporary works such as Alice in Alice’s Adventures in Wonderland. Dorger has also danced in different international galas.

In 2016, Dorger was knighted Ridder af Dannebrogordenen by Queen Margrethe II of Denmark. She is also a co-Director of the Opus1 Scandinavia Foundation in Nairobi, Kenya.

Selected repertoire

 Odette/Odile, Pas de trois &  Pas de quatre, Swan Lake
 Giselle, Giselle
 Alice & Queen of Hearts, Alice’s Adventures in Wonderland
  Teresina & Pas de Six, Napoli
 Lead Ballerina, Ballo della Regina
 “Diamond”,Jewels
 Lead Ballerina, Theme and Variations
 Ballerina, Etudes
 Sugar Plum Fairy, Dew Drop, & Lead Marzipan, The Nutcracker
Tchaikovsky Pas de Deux
 Henriette, Raymonda
 Mistress, Manon
 Polyhymnia, Apollo
 Gamzatti & shade, La Bayadere
 Mercedes & Dryad Queen, Don Quixote
 Prudence Duvernoy, Lady of the Camelias

 Lilac Fairy & Princess Florine, The Sleeping Beauty
 Pas de trois, Agon
 “America”, West Side Story Suite
 Lavinia & Luciana, Romeo and Juliet
 Soloist dancer, Viscera
 First and Second Movement Demi-soloist, Symphony in C
 Don Quixote Grand Pas de Deux
 Raymonda Grand Pas de Deux
 Harlequinade Pas de Deux 
 Coppélia Pas de Deux 
 La Sylphide pas de deux

Created roles
 Schubart Pas de Deux
 Pauline, Queen of Spades
 Daisy Friis, Blixen

References

External links 
 

Living people
American ballerinas
Royal Danish Ballet principal dancers
1989 births
21st-century American ballet dancers
American expatriates in Denmark
Knights First Class of the Order of the Dannebrog
School of American Ballet alumni
21st-century American women